The Turkey women's national under-21 football team is the national under-21 football team of Turkey and is governed by the Turkish Football Federation.

Results

2014

All-time records

The following table shows Turkey women's U-21 all-time international record:

Current squad

Head coach:  Talat Tuncel
Coach:  Necla Güngör
Goalkeeping coach:  Atilla Küçüktaka

See also

 Women's football in Turkey
 Turkey women's national football team
 Turkey women's national under-19 football team
 Turkey women's national under-17 football team

References

Women's national under-21 association football teams
under-21
Youth football in Turkey
European women's national under-21 association football teams